Pitar is a genus of saltwater clams, marine bivalve molluscs in the subfamily Callocardiinae of the family Veneridae, the Venus clams. The genus contains over 60 species.

Species

 Pitar aequinoctialis   Fischer-Piette, 1969  
 Pitar affinis   J. F. Gmelin, 1791  
 Pitar alabastrum (Reeve, 1863)
 Pitar albidus   J. F. Gmelin, 1791  
 Pitar albinus (Lamarck, 1818)
 Pitar arestus   Dall & Simpson, 1901  
 Pitar bermudezi Macsotay & Campos, 2001
 Pitar berryi Keen, 1971
 Pitar brevispinosus   Sowerby, 1851  
 Pitar bucculentus (Römer, 1867)
 Pitar bullatus   Sowerby, 1851  
 Pitar chordatum   Roemer, 1867  
 Pitar citrinus  J. B. Lamarck, 1818 
 Pitar consanguineus  C. B. Adams, 1852 
 Pitar coxeni   Smith, 1885  
 Pitar curnowae Lamprell & Healy, 1997
 Pitar dohrni (Römer, 1867)
 Pitar elatus (G. B. Sowerby III, 1908)
 Pitar erubescens (Dunker, 1853)
 Pitar fluctuatus   Sowerby, 1851  
 Pitar fulminatus   C. T. Menke, 1828  
 Pitar hebraeus   J. B. Lamarck, 1818  
 Pitar helenae   A. A. Olsson, 1961  
 Pitar inconspicuus (G. B. Sowerby I, 1835)
 Pitar indecorus (Philippi, 1848)
 Pitar inflatus (G. B. Sowerby II, 1851)
 Pitar kathiewayae Lamprell & Kilburn, 1999
 Pitar laetus (Linnaeus, 1758)
 Pitar lineolatus G.B.   Sowerby II, 1854  
 Pitar mediterraneus   N. D. N. Tiberi, 1855  
 Pitar multispinosus   Sowerby, 1851  
 Pitar mundus (Römer, 1860)
 Pitar newcombianus (Gabb, 1865)
 Pitar ngocthieni Thach, 2016
 Pitar nicklesi Cosel & Gofas, 2018
 Pitar obliquatus   Hanley, 1844 
 Pitar omissa (Pilsbry & H. N. Lowe, 1932)
 Pitar osmund a   T. Iredale, 1936  
 Pitar pallescens (G. B. Sowerby I, 1835)
 Pitar palmeri   Fischer-Piette & Testud, 1967  
 Pitar pellucidus   J. B. Lamarck, 1818  
 Pitar perfragilis   H. A. Pilsbry & Lowe, 1932  
 Pitar phoenicopterus (Römer, 1867)
 Pitar pilula   Rehder, 1943  
 Pitar potteri Healy & Lamprell, 1992
 Pitar prora  T. A. Conrad, 1837  
 Pitar pura (Deshayes, 1853)
 Pitar queenslandicus Lamprell & Healy, 1997
 Pitar rectodorsalis Lamprell & Kilburn, 1999
 Pitar reeveanum   J. Hidalgo, 1903  
 Pitar rosea   Broderip & Sowerby, 1829  
 Pitar rostratus   Koch, 1844  
 Pitar rudis   Poli, 1795  
 Pitar rufescens (Deshayes, 1853)
 Pitar simpsoni   W. H. Dall, 1889  
 Pitar soligena (Römer, 1867)
 Pitar sophiae   G. F. Angas, 1877  
 Pitar striatus   Gray, 1838  
 Pitar subpellucidus   Sowerby, 1851  
 Pitar sulfureus   H. A. Pilsbry, 1904  
 Pitar tahitensis (Philippi, 1851)
 Pitar thornleyae Lamprell & Healy, 1997
 Pitar tortuosus   W. J. Broderip, 1835  
 Pitar trevori   Lamprell & Whitehead, 1990  
 Pitar tumens   J. F. Gmelin, 1791  
 Pitar virgo (Gray, 1838)
 Pitar vinaceus   A. A. Olsson, 1961  
 Pitar vulneratus   W. J. Broderip, 1835  

Synonyms
 Pitar abbreviatus   C. F. Krauss, 1848  : synonym of Pitar hebraeus (Lamarck, 1818)
 Pitar aletes  J. G. Hertlein & A. M. Strong, 1948  : synonym of Hyphantosoma aletes (Hertlein & A. M. Strong, 1948)
 Pitar alternatus   W. J. Broderip, 1835  : synonym of Lamelliconcha alternata (Broderip, 1835)
 Pitar callicomatus''''   W. H. Dall, 1902  : syno,nym of  Lamelliconcha callicomata (Dall, 1902)
 Pitar circinatus   I. von Born, 1778  : synonym of Lamelliconcha circinata (Born, 1778)
 Pitar concinnus G.B.   Sowerby I, 1835  : synonym of Lamelliconcha concinna (G. B. Sowerby I, 1835)
 Pitar cordatus   Schwengel, 1951  : synonym of Pitarenus cordatus (Schwengel, 1951)
 Pitar dione   C. Linnaeus, 1758  : synonym of Hysteroconcha dione (Linnaeus, 1758)
 Pitar elenensis   A. A. Olsson, 1961  : synonym of Pitar consanguineus (C. B. Adams, 1852)
 Pitar floridella   Gray, 1838  : synonym of Callista floridella (Gray, 1838)
 Pitar frizzelli   J. G. Hertlein & A. M. Strong, 1948  : synonym of Callpita frizzelli (Hertlein & A. M. Strong, 1948) (original combination)
 Pitar hertleini  A. A. Olsson, 1961  : synonym of Hyphantosoma pollicaris (Carpenter, 1864)
 Pitar hesperius   Berry, 1960  : synonym of Lamelliconcha alternata (Broderip, 1835)
 Pitar hoffstetteri   Fischer-Piette, 1969  : synonym of Pitar consanguineus (C. B. Adams, 1852)
 Pitar inconstans   Ch. Hedley, 1923  : synonym of Costellipitar inconstans (Hedley, 1923)
 Pitar indecoroides   Yokoyama, 1928  : synonym of Costellipitar indecoroides (Yokoyama, 1928)
 Pitar japonicum   T. Kuroda & T. Kawamoto, 1956  : synonym of Aphrodora kurodai (Matsubara, 2007) (Invalid: junior homonym of Pitar japonica Ando, 1953; Pitar kurodai is a replacement name)
 Pitar levis   Zorina, 1978  : synonym of Aphrodora hungerfordi (G. B. Sowerby III, 1888)
 Pitar limatulum G.B.   Sowerby II, 1853  : synonym of Hyphantosoma limatulum (G. B. Sowerby II, 1851)
 Pitar lupanaria  R. P. Lesson, 1830  : synonym of Hysteroconcha lupanaria (Lesson, 1831)
 Pitar madecassinus   Fischer-Piette & Delmas, 1967  : synonym of Costellipitar madecassinus (Fischer-Piette & Delmas, 1967)
 Pitar manillae G.B. Sowerby II, 1851 : synonym of Costellipitar manillae (G. B. Sowerby II, 1851)
 Pitar morrhuanus   Linsley, 1848 : synonym of Agriopoma morrhuanum (Dall, 1902)
 Pitar nancyae   Lamprell & Whitehead, 1990  : synonym of Hyphantosoma nancyae (Lamprell & Whitehead, 1990)
 Pitar nipponica   T. Kuroda & T. Habe, 1971  : synonym of Aphrodora nipponica (Kuroda & Habe, 1971)
 Pitar noguchii   T. Habe, 1958  : synonym of Aphrodora noguchii (Habe, 1958)
 Pitar paytensis   d'Orbigny, 1845  : synonym of Lamelliconcha paytensis (d'Orbigny, 1845)
 Pitar pollicaris   P. P. Carpenter, 1864  : synonym of Hyphantosoma pollicaris (Carpenter, 1864)
 Pitar regularis  Smith, 1885 : synonym of Costellipitar regularis (E. A. Smith, 1885)
 Pitar spoori Lamprell & Whitehead, 1990 : synonym of Hyphantosoma spoori (Lamprell & Whitehead, 1990)
 Pitar sulcata Zorina, 1978  : synonym of Aphrodora sulcata (Zorina, 1978)
 Pitar tellinoidea  G.B. Sowerby II, 1851 : synonym of Costellipitar cor (Hanley, 1844)
 Pitar unicolor G.B.  Sowerby I, 1835 : synonym of Lamelliconcha unicolor (G. B. Sowerby I, 1835)
 Pitar variegatum  T. Kuroda & T. Habe, 1971 : synonym of Pitar inflatus (G. B. Sowerby II, 1851)
 Pitar yerburyi  Smith, 1891  : synonym of Aphrodora yerburyi (E. A. Smith, 1891)
 Pitar zonatus  W. H. Dall, 1902 : synonym of Pitarenus zonatus'' (Dall, 1902)

References

 Jukes-Browne, A. J. 1913. On Callista, Amiantis, and Pitaria. Proceedings of the Malacological Society of London 10: 335-347.
 Coan, E. V.; Valentich-Scott, P. (2012). Bivalve seashells of tropical West America. Marine bivalve mollusks from Baja California to northern Peru. 2 vols, 1258 pp.

External links
 Römer E. (1857). Kritische Untersuchung der Arten des Mollusken-Geschlechts Venus bei Linné und Gmelin, mit Berücksichtigung der später beschriebenen Arten. Marburg. xiii + 135 p
 Römer E. (1862). Kritische Uebersicht der Arten ans der Cythereen-gruppe Caryatis Römer (Pitar olim). Malakozoologische Blätter. 9: 58-86
 Dall, W. H. (1902). Synopsis of the family Veneridae and of the North American Recent species. Proceedings of the United States National Museum. 26 (1312): 335-412
 Rehder H.A. (1943). New marine mollusks from the Antillean Region. Proceedings of the United States National Museum. 93(3161): 187-203, pls 19-20.

 
Bivalve genera